The Amphibious Battalion "Sile" is the an inactive unit of Italian Army's infantry arm's amphibious Lagunari speciality. The name of the specialty comes from the Italian word for lagoon, while the battalion's name "Sile" commemorates the Cacciatori del Sile - a unit of Venetian volunteers, who fought against the Austro-Hungarian Army during the Siege of Venice in 1848 - and also commemorates the battles fought by the Royal Italian Army against Austro-Hungarian troops along the Sile river in 1917 and 1918 during World War I. The battalion was based on Sant'Andrea island in the Venetian Lagoon and at Cà Vio on the Litorale del Cavallino peninsula, which separates the Venetian Lagoon from the Adriatic Sea and is bound on its North by the Sile river. The battalion was assigned to the Amphibious Troops Command and today lives on as Amphibious Tactical Support Company of the Lagunari Regiment "Serenissima"

History

Republic of San Marco 
In 1848 the revolutions erupted in the Italian states and in Venice Daniele Manin declared the Republic of San Marco. The cities of the former Republic of Venice raised volunteer units to fight the Austrian forces, which occupied the region. One such force were the Cacciatori del Sile, a light infantry unit formed by the cities of Treviso and Padua and named for the Sile river, which straddles the Venetian Lagoon. On 21 October 1848 the unit moved through the Venetian Lagoon to attack Austrian forces on the Cavallino peninsula. After routing the Austrians the unit returned to its base in Venice-Lido, where on 23 October General Guglielmo Pepe honored the unit with a visit. In 1849 the Austrians subjugated the city and dissolved the Cacciatori del Sile.

World War I 
During World War I the 4th Engineer Regiment (Pontieri) provided a total of eight Lagunari companies, which operated on the extreme right flank of the Italian front in the estuaries of the Isonzo and Timavo river. After the Battle of Caporetto and the Italian retreat to the Piave river the companies operated in the Piave estuary and along the Sile river.

Cold War 
In 1964 the Lagunari Regiment "Serenissima" formed an Amphibious Transports Company, which consisted of amphibious vehicle platoons based in Cà Vio and boat platoons based on the island of Sant'Andrea.

During the 1975 army reform the Italian Army disbanded the regimental level and newly independent battalions were granted for the first time their own flags. On 20 October 1975 the Lagunari Regiment "Serenissima" was disbanded and the Amphibious Transports Company in Sant'Andrea and Ca' Vio was reorganized and renamed Amphibious Vehicles Battalion "Sile". The battalion was assigned to the Amphibious Troops Command and consisted of a command, a command and services company, an amphibious vehicles company, and a nautical vehicles company.

On 12 November 1976 the battalion was granted a flag by decree 846 of the President of the Italian Republic Giovanni Leone.

On 25 June 1984 the Lagunari became a distinct speciality within the Italian Army's infantry arm and the same year the battalion was renamed Amphibious Battalion "Sile".

Recent times 
In 1992 the three companies of the Amphibious Battalion "Sile" were reduced to platoons: Amphibious Vehicles Platoon, Watercrafts Platoon, and Reconnaissance Platoon, which were all assigned to the Nautical Vehicles Company. On 13 October 1992 the battalion was disbanded and the next day the Nautical Vehicles Company entered the reformed Lagunari Regiment "Serenissima". Today the company exists as Amphibious Tactical Support Company and is still based on Sant'Andrea island.

Structure 
The Amphibious Vehicles Battalion "Sile" had a unique organization among Italian Army units, as its purpose was to provide naval transport and reconnaissance capabilities to the 1st Lagunari Battalion "Serenissima". Initially the unit had the following organization:

  Amphibious Vehicles Battalion "Sile", on Sant'Andrea island
 Command, on Sant'Andrea island
 Command and Services Company, on Sant'Andrea island
 Command and Services Platoon
 Reconnaissance Platoon
 Repairs and Supplies Platoon
 Amphibious Vehicles Company, in Cà Vio
 Command Squad
 Amphibious Vehicles Platoon
 Nautical Vehicles Company, on Sant'Andrea island
 Command Squad
 Landing Crafts Platoon
 Watercrafts Platoon

The Amphibious Vehicles Company was equipped with 15 LVTP-7 tracked amphibious landing vehicles, one LVTP-7C tracked amphibious command post vehicle, and one LVTP-7R tracked amphibious recovery vehicle. In 1980s the LVTP-7 vehicles were upgraded to Assault Amphibious Vehicles. The Nautical Vehicles Company was equipped with personnel landing crafts, medium landing crafts, small patrol boats, naval ambulances, and rigid-hull inflatable boats.

See also 
 Lagunari Regiment "Serenissima"

References

Italian Marines